John Hlay (born May 21, 1930 in Niles, Ohio) is a former college football running back. He was a fullback and linebacker for the Ohio State University Buckeyes from 1950 to 1952.

Football career

High school
Hlay was an All-State football player at Niles McKinley High School. He was heavily recruited by colleges, and narrowly chose Ohio State over Purdue University after Ohio State head coach Wes Fesler played on Hlay's state loyalties.

College
As a sophomore Hlay lettered as a backup fullback and linebacker on the 1950 Ohio State team. He suffered academic setbacks prior to his junior year, and incoming head coach Woody Hayes benched him for the first three games of the 1951 season. When Hlay returned to the field in the fourth game of the season it was as a defensive replacement, playing exclusively as linebacker.  Hlay returned to the offensive backfield in his senior year, in part due to the support of backfield coach Doyt Perry.

As a senior Hlay led the Buckeyes in rushing, despite a backfield loaded with such talent as freshman Howard "Hopalong" Cassady, sophomore Bobby Watkins, and senior Fred Bruney. Hlay's highest single-game rushing total was a 135-yard performance in a 21-14 loss to Purdue on October 4, 1952.

Professional
Hlay was selected by the Green Bay Packers in the 1953 NFL Draft. He was drafted in the 16th round as the 187th overall selection (comparable to the sixth round in the modern 32-team draft). Hlay deferred reporting to Green Bay in 1953, but arrived the following year. The Green Bay staff had intended to play Hlay at linebacker, but filled that need in the 1954 draft with Art Hunter out of Notre Dame University. Green Bay traded Hlay to the New York Giants, but an ankle injury prevented him from joining the team.

After football
Hlay decided against trying out with the Giants in 1955. By that time he had become a restaurateur and bar-owner, and an National Football League career in that era would have meant a reduction in pay. Over his career, Hlay owned three different bars. He also worked in remodelling.  

His daughter Jill Hlay was a world-class swimmer, winning a bronze medal in the 100 meter backstroke at the 1971 Pan Am Games. Jill's son Matt Voelker is currently a freestyle swimmer on the Ohio State University swimming team.

External links
John Hlay profile from Niles McKinley High School

1930 births
Living people
People from Niles, Ohio
Players of American football from Ohio
American football linebackers
American football running backs
Niles McKinley High School alumni
Ohio State Buckeyes football players
Ohio State University alumni
Drinking establishment owners